"I'm Dreamin"' is a song by American recording R&B artist Christopher Williams. It is featured in ending credits of the 1991 film New Jack City and its soundtrack, in which Williams has a supporting role as Kareem Akbar. The song peaked number-one on Billboards US R&B Songs chart becoming Williams' first and only song to reach that position.

Track listing

12" vinyl
A1. "I'm Dreamin'" (Radio Mix Without Rap) – 4:35
A2. "I'm Dreamin'" (Radio Mix With Rap) – 5:06
A3. "I'm Dreamin'" (Instrumental With Background Vocals) – 5:06
B1. "I'm Dreamin'" (Crazy Hip Hop) – 5:06
B2. "I'm Dreamin'" (Hip Hop Radio) – 5:06
B3. "I'm Dreamin'" (A Capella Slap Bass) – 5:06

7" vinyl
A1. "I'm Dreamin'" (Radio Mix Without Rap) – 4:35
B2. "I'm Dreamin'" (Hip Hop Radio) – 5:06
Cassette
A1. "I'm Dreamin'" (Radio Mix Without Rap) – 4:35
B1. "I'm Dreamin'" (Radio Mix With Rap) – 5:06

Charts

See also
List of number-one R&B singles of 1991 (U.S.)

References

1991 singles
Christopher Williams (singer) songs
New jack swing songs